The Sandman is a Big Finish Productions audio drama based on the long-running British science fiction television series Doctor Who.

Plot
When the Sixth Doctor and Evelyn visit the Clutch — a large community of spacecraft that never settle on one planet — Evelyn discovers that the Doctor is held in fear by the Galyari. They know him as "the Sandman", a figure from their mythology, an ancient bogeyman — and the Doctor does not deny being that which they regard with fear.

Cast
The Doctor — Colin Baker
Evelyn Smythe — Maggie Stables
Director Nrosha — Anneke Wills
Orchestrator Shol — Mark Donovan
Commander Brel — Mark Wharton
Mordecan — Robin Bowerman
Nintaru — Stephanie Colburn
General Voshkar — Ian Hogg

Notes
Anneke Wills played the First and Second Doctor's companion Polly from 1966 to 1967.
The Galyari come up against the Seventh Doctor in Dreamtime.

External links
Big Finish Productions – The Sandman

2002 audio plays
Sixth Doctor audio plays
Sandman